Naveed Akram (born May 16, 1984) is a Pakistani international footballer who plays as a right-back for Lyallpur.
Akram won three national titles with WAPDA. He was part of the Lahore Lajpaal team that lost in the semi-finals of Geo Super Football League.

He made his international debut on 16 June 2005 during the Indo-Pak series.

Playing style
Naveed plays as an attacking right back on the pitch, and always tends to assist in the attacking plays as well as having a knack of scoring goals himself.

He is most known for his memorable long range goal in the 2006 Asian games football when Pakistan came close to a huge upset against Japan.

International career stats

Goals for Senior National Team

Honours

Club

WAPDA
National Championship/Pakistan Premier League: 2003, 2004–05, 2007–08

International

Pakistan
South Asian Games: 2004, 2006

References

External links
Naveed Akram scores for Pakistan

1984 births
Living people
Pakistani footballers
Pakistan international footballers
Association football fullbacks
People from Multan
WAPDA F.C. players
Footballers at the 2006 Asian Games
Punjabi people
South Asian Games gold medalists for Pakistan
Asian Games competitors for Pakistan
South Asian Games medalists in football